Goran (also, Göran  and Gëran) is a village and municipality in the Goranboy Rayon of Azerbaijan.  It has a population of 228.

References 

Populated places in Goranboy District